Komin is a village in Dubrovnik-Neretva County in Croatia on the river Neretva. It has a population of 941 inhabitants.

At one time in 1918 a hoard of about 300,000 ancient Roman coins was found here.

References 

Populated places in Dubrovnik-Neretva County